Hans-Georg Jaunich (born 18 October 1951 in Schwaan) is a former East German handball player who competed in the 1980 Summer Olympics.

He was a member of the East German handball team which won the gold medal. He played three matches and scored one goal.

References

External links
profile

1951 births
Living people
German male handball players
Handball players at the 1980 Summer Olympics
Olympic handball players of East Germany
Olympic gold medalists for East Germany
Olympic medalists in handball
Medalists at the 1980 Summer Olympics
Recipients of the Patriotic Order of Merit